Statistics Canada divides the province of Manitoba into 23 census divisions. Unlike in some other provinces, census divisions do not reflect the organization of local government in Manitoba. These areas exist solely for the purposes of statistical analysis and presentation; they have no government of their own.

See also

Administrative divisions of Canada
List of communities in Manitoba
List of municipalities in Manitoba
List of regions of Manitoba

External links 
 Government of Manitoba Community Profiles. Census Divisions Map

Census divisions